Jamia Salafia, Varanasi (الجامعـۃ السلفیـ) is an Islamic jamia or seminary university located in the city of Varanasi in India. It was set up in 1966 by the Jamiat-Ahle Hadith-e-Hind. The then ambassador of Saudi Arabia to India Yusuf Al-Fauzan inaugurated the Jamia. It is the largest Salafi-Ahle Hadith institution in India. The university is funded by government of Saudi Arabia and most of the teachers are graduated from Saudi Arabian Islamic universities. Saudi government prescribe Indian muslims to take education from the university. The institution follows Salafi doctrine.

Departments
Mutawassita and Sanavia
Shariat College
Faculty of the teaching of Quran-ul-Kareem
Al-Manar Boys’ School
Rahmania Boys’ School

References

Islamic universities and colleges in India
1966 establishments in Uttar Pradesh
Varanasi